During the 2002–03 English football season, Brentford competed in Football League Second Division. Despite an unbeaten start and topping the table, the club won just four of the final 21 matches of the season to slump to a 16th-place finish.

Season summary

After defeat in the 2002 Second Division play-off Final, the team was broken up, with high earners Ívar Ingimarsson, Lloyd Owusu and captain Paul Evans released. Manager Steve Coppell resigned in June 2002 and was replaced by his assistant, Wally Downes. The squad was reinforced with free transfer and non-contract players. The loss of Lloyd Owusu up front and the return of loanee Ben Burgess to Blackburn Rovers led to the loan signing of youngster Rowan Vine from Portsmouth and a chance for Mark McCammon as a first-choice striker. A number of youth products were also promoted to the first team squad.

Throughout the season, a need to balance the books in the wake of the ITV Digital collapse saw no transfer fees paid out and a reduction of the wage bill. The cash crisis heightened in the week leading up to the beginning of the season, when a deadline of 7 August 2002 was set, on which Griffin Park would be sold to developers Wimpey or if the deal fell through, Brentford would be entered into administration. The deal hit a stumbling block, but administration was staved off by the £400,000 sale of central defender Darren Powell on the eve of the season. The financial state of affairs left Brentford £4 million in debt and led Managing Director Gary Hargreaves to state that the club would "have to sell the freehold of Griffin Park without any guarantee of a return to the borough in the near future". In September 2002, Richard Thompson's £7 million bid to buy the club was turned down by supporters' trust Bees United. 

Despite the turmoil, rookie manager Downes had a dream start, going unbeaten for the first seven league matches of the season, topping the table and winning the Manager of the Month award. The rot set in mid-September, with the Bees losing five of six matches, which included heavy successive defeats to Peterborough United in the league and Middlesbrough in the League Cup. The team began to recover in mid-October, losing just four of the following 17 matches, including two wins in the Football League Trophy and three in the FA Cup, with First Division Derby County being beaten at Griffin Park in the FA Cup third round on 4 January 2003. Brentford limped through the remainder of the season, winning just four and losing 13 of the remaining 24 matches of the season. The goalscoring problem was compounded by the release of Mark McCammon on deadline day in March and injuries and international call-ups had mounted up, with Martin Rowlands, Leo Roget, Jay Smith, Stephen Evans, Jamie Fullarton and Eddie Hutchinson all spending time on the treatment table. Also in March, Ron Noades resigned as chairman and director, citing that "the death of the transfer market has prevented us from covering our trading losses incurred at Griffin Park" and revealing that the wage bill would be slashed from £706,000 for the 2002–03 season to £476,000 for 2003–04. Brentford finished the 2002–03 season in 16th place.

League table

Results
Brentford's goal tally listed first.

Legend

Pre-season

Football League Second Division

FA Cup

Football League Cup

Football League Trophy

 Sources: Soccerbase, 11v11

Playing squad 
Players' ages are as of the opening day of the 2002–03 season.

 Source: Soccerbase

Coaching staff

Statistics

Appearances and goals
Substitute appearances in brackets.

 Players listed in italics left the club mid-season.
 Source: Soccerbase

Goalscorers 

 Players listed in italics left the club mid-season.
 Source: Soccerbase

Discipline

 Players listed in italics left the club mid-season.
 Source: ESPN FC

Management

Summary

Transfers & loans

Kit

|
|

Awards 
 Supporters' Player of the Year: Paul Smith
 Football League Second Division Manager of the Month: Wally Downes (August 2002)

References

Brentford F.C. seasons
Brentford